The Back to Work Coalition is a group of twelve offshore oil and gas industry stakeholders and trade associations, that have banded together to oppose the federal and regulatory policies placed on the industry following the Deepwater Horizon oil well explosion of April 2010. After the explosion, the Obama administration imposed a federal moratorium on deepwater drilling that lasted through mid-October 2010.  The Back to Work Coalition was created in December 2010 to combat what the members believe is a "de facto" moratorium, caused by the federal government's hesitance in issuing drilling permits on the gulf's Outer Continental Shelf (OCS).  The coalition was founded by Louisiana Department of Natural Resources (DNR) Secretary Scott Angelle.  The coalition is facilitated by the Gulf Economic Survival Team (GEST), a non-profit organization created to restore Louisiana's economy following the moratorium.

Members
The Back to Work Coalition Leadership Advisory Committee includes: 
GEST 
Louisiana Oil & Gas Association (LOGA) 
Louisianan Mid-Continental Oil and Gas Association (LMOGA) 
American Petroleum Institute (API)
National Ocean Industries Association (NOIA) 
International Association of Drilling Contractors (IADC) 
Offshore Marine Service Association (OMSA) 
Offshore Operators Committee (OOC) 
Independent Petroleum Association of America (IPAA) 
Greater New Orleans, Inc (GNO, Inc) 
U.S. Oil and Gas Association 
United States Chamber of Commerce

Participating members of the Louisiana Congressional Delegation include:
 Senator Mary Landrieu
 Senator David Vitter
 Congressman Charles Boustany
 Congressman Steve Scalise
 Congressman Bill Cassidy 
 Congressman-elect Jeff Landry

Background
On April 20, 2010, the Deepwater Horizon oil well, a 9-year-old semi-submersible mobile offshore drilling unit owned by BP, exploded in the Gulf of Mexico. The well spilled for three months, causing the world’s largest accidental release of oil into marine waters.  Federal science and engineering teams estimate that 53,000 barrels of oil a day poured from the well just before BP was able to cap it on July 15. They also estimate that the daily flow rate diminished over time, starting at about 62,000 barrels a day and decreasing as the reservoir of hydrocarbons feeding the gusher was gradually depleted.

As a response to the environmental dangers that the oil spill created, the federal government under President Barack Obama issued a mandatory moratorium on energy exploration and drilling in the Gulf of Mexico.  The original moratorium, which was issued on May 28, was struck down by a federal court in New Orleans.  A second moratorium was issued on June 12 and was scheduled to continue until the end of November. The nearly 6-month long moratorium was widely not welcomed by Louisianans because of its negative economic effects.  Local officials, lawmakers and oil industry workers feared the moratorium would cost hundreds of thousands of jobs and add insult to injury for a regional economy already battered by the massive spill.

After the moratorium was lifted, the Obama administration released a set of regulatory initiatives that appear to bottleneck the process of getting a permit to drill. This led to what many Louisiana lawmakers and workers now refer to as the "de facto" moratorium, or "permitorium", on energy production in the Outer Continental Shelf of the Gulf Coast.  This "de facto" moratorium is what Angelle's Back to Work Coalition seeks to combat.  The coalition, Angelle says, serves to "identify the obstacles standing in the way of the issuance of new permits" and keep "working toward solutions."  Angelle believes that "the deepwater drilling moratorium may have been lifted, but the federal regulatory challenges continue to delay the return of new drilling in the Gulf. It is time to get the men and women of this industry back to work, as well as the other industries that are dependent upon drilling activity for survival."

Louisiana oil industry
The oil and gas industry is one of the leading industries in Louisiana in the terms of economic impact, taxes paid and people employed.  The Louisiana oil and gas industry is really four industries in one. There is the familiar exploration and production segment, which is responsible for finding and producing oil and natural gas. Next there is the refining section, which takes crude oil and turns it into useful products like gasoline, diesel and chemical feed stock. Next comes the marketing section, which includes the gasoline stations. Finally, there is the transportation section, which includes pipelines carrying crude oil, natural gas and refined products.

An economic impact study conducted by Dr. Loren Scott shows that the total direct and indirect impact on the state is approximately $65 billion. The direct impact comes from the taxes, royalties, fees, salaries, and other money spent in Louisiana by the oil and gas industry. The indirect impact results from the salaries and wages earned by oil and gas employees being spent in the state as well as service companies, which do business with oil and gas companies and then do business with other companies. Virtually all parishes in Louisiana have some oil and gas activity.

The offshore industry operating in the Gulf of Mexico, outside the state’s territorial boundaries has a tremendous impact on the state. A study conducted by Applied Technology Research Inc. shows that the offshore industry has a direct impact of $3 billion on the state. The offshore industry pays more than $500 million in salaries and wages to people working in the Gulf of Mexico. Another $2.5 billion is spent with companies operating in Louisiana and doing business with the offshore industry. It is important to remember that everything used on an offshore platform has to come from somewhere onshore.

The refining segment of the industry has an $8 billion impact on the state. Approximately half of that amount is spent on the purchase of crude oil and the remainder is spent on salaries, wages, services and supplies used at the refineries.

(Paraphrased from the Louisiana Mid-Continent Oil and Gas Association Industry Overview)

Timeline

December 2010
 December 8- DNR Secretary Scott Angelle met with Director Michael Bromwich of the Bureau of Ocean Energy Management, Regulation and Enforcement (BOEMRE) in Houma, Louisiana.  Angelle classified the meeting as "productive," and Bromwich made a commitment that "no new rules or regulations would be issued unless through an investigation it is determined that the failure to issue a new rule would be irresponsible."
 December 9- The Back to Work Coalition held its inaugural meeting in New Orleans, Louisiana and identified the obstacles being faced in the permitting process.  The group determined that steps need to be taken in: Expediting Plan Approvals, Clarification of new regulation and permitting rules and NEPA and Environmental Assessment requirements.  Executive Director Lori Leblanc of GEST was quoted stated, "Our focus is simply on getting our Coast back to work fueling America.  We will be working aggressively over the next few weeks and months to get clarification on new rules issued by the BOEM for driling plans and permits, and then to pressure the agency to apply necessary resources to expeditiously process backlogged drilling plans, particularly for deepwater operations, so permits can effectively move through the system."

January 2011
 January 3- BOEMRE notified 13 companies (16 wells) whose deepwater drilling activities were suspended by the deepwater drilling moratorium that they may be able to resume previously approved activities. BOEMRE explained that these companies need not submit revised exploration or development plans for supplemental National Environmental Policy Act (NEPA) reviews, provided they comply with BOEMRE’s new policies and regulations.
 January 11- National Commission on the BP Deepwater Horizon Oil Spill released its final report.
 January 21- The Back to Work Coalition issued a rebuttal to the seemingly negative report from the National Commission on the BP Deepwater Horizon Oil Spill, defending the hard work of the oil companies and the importance of getting the unemployed back to work.

February 2011
 February 4- Secretary Angelle and members of the Back to Work Coalition met with BOEMRE Director Michael Bromwich for the fourth time in three weeks.
 February 28-
 The first deepwater drilling permit since the moratorium was issued.  The permit was issued to Noble for a bypass of an obstruction in a well near Deepwater Horizon that had already been in the process of drilling when the Deepwater Horizon spill halted further progress.
 Angelle and the Back to Work Coalition met with BOEMRE Director Bromwich for the sixth time in five weeks.  BOEMRE announced that 41 more wells whose activities were suspended by the moratorium may be able to resume previously approved activities.

March 2011
 March 16- DNR Secretary Scott Angelle testified before the U.S. House of Representatives Committee on Natural Resources.  The hearing highlighted the economic and community impacts of the deepwater permitting delays in the Gulf of Mexico.
 March 21- BOEMRE approved Shell deepwater exploration plan.
 March 24- Chevron won approval to continue drilling an exploratory well in the Gulf of Mexico — the first deep-water wildcat to be permitted since last year’s oil spill.  Chevron’s well would be the first in an unknown reservoir where oil or gas has not been produced.  The other permits — all issued in the past four weeks — have gone to projects where wells have already been drilled and discoveries have been made.

Controversy
The idea of a de facto moratorium is not looked upon as fact all around the country.  The debate between the federal government and Louisiana state leaders over planning and drilling permits has come under tough scrutiny by those who agree and those who disagree with the existence of a "permitorium".  Democrats on the House Committee of Natural Resources, in particular, suggest that there is no such thing.  Others agree that a "permitorium" is in fact taking place, but argue that the safety of oil-rig workers and the well-being of the environment are too important to risk with pre-mature drilling.  Rep. Edward Markey, D-Mass., was quoted saying, "There is not a de facto moratorium, only a Republican moratorium on the facts.  This hearing is taking place in a parallel universe where we didn't have the nation's worst oil spill last year in which 11 lives were lost.  A parallel universe where new drilling is not being approved as we speak."

References

External links
New industry coalition confronts Gulf permitting issues
:: Baton Rouge Business Report :: The Dickens you say
DNR Secretary Angelle Statement On Today’s Meeting With BOEMRE Director Bromwich - KPEL 96.5
Gulf Spill Is the Largest of Its Kind, Scientists Say
Politics | News from The Advocate

Deepwater Horizon oil spill
Organizations established in 2010
2010 establishments in the United States